Rotberger is a wine grape variety. Its parentage is not known with certainty but it is thought to be from a cross of Trollinger and Riesling grapes. Dr. Heinrich Birk (1898-1973) produced the cross at the Geisenheim Grape Breeding Institute in 1928. It is used to produce fruity, early maturing light red wines in cool-climate areas. It is often best drunk when young and can be used to produce a rosé or sparkling wine. It has no relationship with the Rotburger variety bearing a nearly similar name which is also known as Zweigelt.

Production of rotberger is quite small and primarily limited to Austria, Canada, Germany, and Liechtenstein.

References

Red wine grape varieties
Rheingau